Świerzawa is a town in Złotoryja County, Lower Silesian Voivodeship, in south-western Poland. It is the seat of the administrative district (gmina) called Gmina Świerzawa.

As of 2019, the town has a population of 2,286.

Twin towns – sister cities
See twin towns of Gmina Świerzawa.

References

Cities and towns in Lower Silesian Voivodeship
Złotoryja County